The 2018 RAN Women's Sevens was the 14th edition of the annual rugby sevens tournament organized by Rugby Americas North. It will be played at the Barbados Polo Club in Saint James, Barbados, with the winner eligible for the 2019 Hong Kong Women's Sevens qualifier tournament and two teams advancing to the 2019 Pan American Games.

Teams
The following ten teams will participate:

Pool stage
All times in Atlantic Standard Time (UTC−04:00)

Pool A

Pool B

Knockout stage

Trophy

Plate

Cup

Standings

See also
 2019 Hong Kong Women's Sevens

References

2018
2018 rugby sevens competitions
2018 in North American rugby union
2018 in women's rugby union
rugby union
rugby union
Qualification tournaments for the 2019 Pan American Games